is a railway station in Kumamoto City, Kumamoto Prefecture, Japan. It is on the Fujisaki Line, operated by the Kumamoto Electric Railway. Trains arrive every thirty minutes.

This station is located near Fujisaki Hachimangū, where its name originates.

Lines
 Kumamoto Electric Railway
 Fujisaki Line

References

Kumamoto Electric Railway Fujisaki Line
Railway stations in Kumamoto Prefecture
Railway stations in Japan opened in 1949